Lazurny is a rural locality (a settlement) in Shchetinsky Selsoviet Rural Settlement, Kursky District, Kursk Oblast, Russia. Population:

Geography 
The settlement is located 100 km from the Russia–Ukraine border, 3 km north-east of the district center – the town Kursk, 1.5 km from the selsoviet center – Shchetinka.

 Streets
There are the following streets in the locality: Lunnaya, Poselochnaya, Poselochnaya Vtoraya and Poselochnaya Tretya (43 houses).

 Climate
Lazurny has a warm-summer humid continental climate (Dfb in the Köppen climate classification).

Transport 
Lazurny is located 9 km from the federal route  Crimea Highway (a part of the European route ), on the road of regional importance  (Kursk – Ponyri), on the road of intermunicipal significance  (38K-018 – Kamyshi), 0.2 km from the railway junction 530 km (railway line Oryol – Kursk).

The rural locality is situated 6 km from Kursk Vostochny Airport, 128 km from Belgorod International Airport and 204 km from Voronezh Peter the Great Airport.

References

Notes

Sources

Rural localities in Kursky District, Kursk Oblast